Valebø Church is a parish church of the Church of Norway in Skien Municipality in Vestfold og Telemark county, Norway. It is located in the village of Valebø. It is one of the churches for the Gjerpen parish which is part of the Skien prosti (deanery) in the Diocese of Agder og Telemark. The white, wooden church was built in a long church design in 1903 using plans drawn up by the architects H. Lie and A. Sigvartsen. The church seats about 150 people.

History
Historically, the Valebø area was part of the Romnes Church parish, but in 1867, the church was closed after a new, larger Holla Church was opened. The people of Valebø then had a much longer journey to church. The parish opened a cemetery in Valebø soon after this, but it was not until around 1900 when permission was given to build an annex chapel in Valebø. It was designed by H. Lie and built by builder Svend Sigurdsen in 1902–1903. The new building was consecrated on 24 June 1903 (midsummer day). The wooden timber-framed long church with a church porch and bell tower on the west end a chancel in the east that has a half-octagon shaped apse. Around the turn of the 21st century, the church was made into a parish church and it was then renamed Valebø Church (instead of the historic name Valebø Chapel).

See also
List of churches in Agder og Telemark

References

Buildings and structures in Skien
Churches in Vestfold og Telemark
Long churches in Norway
Wooden churches in Norway
20th-century Church of Norway church buildings
Churches completed in 1903
1903 establishments in Norway